Oxyurichthys takagi is a species of goby is found in the Western Pacific: known only from Palau.

The fish is named for K. Takagi.

References

takagi
Fish of the Pacific Ocean
Taxa named by Frank Lorenzo Pezold III
Fish described in 1998